Torsvåg Lighthouse is a coastal lighthouse located in Karlsøy Municipality in Troms og Finnmark county, Norway. The lighthouse is in the village of Torsvåg on a small island connected to the main island of Vannøya by a short causeway.

History
The lighthouse was first lit in 1916, automated in 1986, and has not had an on-site lighthouse keeper since 2006.

See also

Lighthouses in Norway
List of lighthouses in Norway

References

External links
 Norsk Fyrhistorisk Forening 

Karlsøy
Lighthouses completed in 1916
Lighthouses in Troms og Finnmark
1916 establishments in Norway